Viva was Xmal Deutschland's third album, released in 1987. "Matador" was produced by the Stranglers's Hugh Cornwell and was released as a single in the UK in 1986.

Track listing (CD version with two bonus tracks)
 "Matador" – 4:00
 "Eisengrau" – 2:57
 "Sickle Moon" – 3:36
 "If Only" – 4:11
 "Feuerwerk (31-dez)" – 6:02
 "Illusion (Version)" – 4:06
 "Morning (Will There Really Be)" – 6:04
 "Manchmal" – 3:41
 "Polarlicht" – 3:17
 "Ozean" – 4:53
 "Dogma I" – 4:04
 "4" – 2:56

References

Xmal Deutschland albums
1987 albums